William Lajousky (April 18, 1913 – January 7, 1973) was an American football guard who played one season with the Pittsburgh Pirates of the National Football League. He played college football at the Catholic University of America and attended Worcester Classical High School in Worcester, Massachusetts.

References

External links
Just Sports Stats

1913 births
1973 deaths
American football guards
Catholic University Cardinals football players
Lithuanian emigrants to the United States
Pittsburgh Pirates (football) players
Players of American football from Massachusetts
Sportspeople from Vilnius
People from Vilensky Uyezd
Lithuanian players of American football